Merika Coleman (born September 6, 1973) is an American politician who is the Vice-Minority Leader of the Alabama House of Representatives. She was first elected to the House in 2002.

Education and early career 
Coleman received a B.A. in mass communication in 1995 and an M.P.A. Degree in 1997, both from the University of Alabama at Birmingham.

Earlier in her career, Coleman worked as a public policy analyst and strategist in nonprofits. She became the Director of Community and Economic Development for Lawson State Community College, and later became Director of Economic and Community Development for the City of Bessemer, Alabama.

Political career 
In 2002, Coleman was elected to the Alabama House of Representatives. In 2004 she was a Fleming Fellow with the Center for Policy Alternatives.

In 2009, Coleman ran for a State Senate seat in a special election. She placed second among the eight candidates in the primary, and advanced to the runoff election. She lost the runoff to Priscilla Dunn.  She won her 2010 House reelection campaign with 68% of the vote.

Coleman cosponsored a bill criminalizing human trafficking in Alabama, which became law in 2010. At the time, Alabama was one of six states to not have a human trafficking law.  Coleman has also sponsored bills on parole reform and adding restrictions to Alabama's Stand Your Ground law.

As of 2017, she was Chair of the Boards and Commissions Committee, and served on the Judiciary, Ways and Means General Fund, and Banking Committees. In February 2017, she became Assistant Minority Leader of the House of Representatives.  Coleman is also an Assistant Professor of Political Science at Miles College in Fairfield, Alabama.

References

External links
Alabama House of Representatives – Rep. Merika Coleman official AL House site
Project Vote Smart – Representative Merika Coleman (AL) profile
Follow the Money – Merika Coleman: 2008 2006 2002 campaign contributions

Democratic Party members of the Alabama House of Representatives
1973 births
Living people
African-American state legislators in Alabama
African-American women in politics
Politicians from Birmingham, Alabama
People from Lakenheath
University of Alabama at Birmingham alumni
Women state legislators in Alabama
21st-century American politicians
21st-century American women politicians
21st-century African-American women
21st-century African-American politicians
20th-century African-American people
20th-century African-American women